Ahmad Nufiandani (born 20 November 1994) is an Indonesian professional footballer who plays as a winger for Liga 1 club Persebaya Surabaya. He is also a Second Sergeant in the Indonesian Army.

Club career 
He played since 2014 for Persijap Jepara. On 30 November 2014, he signed with Arema Cronus.

Career statistics

Club

International goals 
Scores and results list the Indonesia's goal tally first.
Indonesia U-23

Honours

Clubs
Arema
 Indonesian Inter Island Cup: 2014/15

References

External links 
 
 Ahmad Nufiandani at Liga Indonesia

1995 births
Living people
People from Kediri (city)
Indonesian footballers
Indonesian Premier Division players
Liga 1 (Indonesia) players
Persijap Jepara players
Arema F.C. players
PSIS Semarang players
Persikabo 1973 players
Persik Kediri players
Persebaya Surabaya players
Sportspeople from East Java
Indonesia youth international footballers
Association football midfielders